The Bears–Lions rivalry is a National Football League (NFL) rivalry between the Chicago Bears and Detroit Lions. The franchises first met in 1930 when the Lions were known as the Portsmouth Spartans and based in Portsmouth, Ohio. They moved to Detroit for the 1934 season. The Bears and Lions have been division rivals since 1933 and have usually met twice a season since the Lions franchise began.  The two teams play in the two largest metropolitan areas in the Midwest.  Chicago and Detroit's home stadiums, Soldier Field and Ford Field, are 280 miles apart and both are easily accessible from I-94.

This rivalry is the longest-running annual series in the NFL as both teams have met at least once a season since 1930. (Due to the 1982 strike, the Bears–Packers rivalry, which began in 1921, was not played that season.)

The Bears dominated the rivalry in the early days from the 1930s to the 1950s, when they were a perennial powerhouse team under head coach George "Papa Bear" Halas. Through the 1965 season, the final season before the first Super Bowl was played, Chicago was 47–22–4 against Detroit. However, the series has been subsequently more even, with Chicago going 57–55–1 since that time.  This is despite the fact that the Bears have been far more successful than the Lions since that season, reaching the NFC Divisional Playoffs twelve times (winning five of those playoff games, two NFC titles, and a Super Bowl) while the Lions have only reached the Divisional Playoffs three times, winning just one of those games, and have not won an NFC title. The Bears won the only playoff meeting between the two teams, the 1932 NFL Championship Game, 9–0.

Notable rivalry moments
December 18, 1932 NFL Playoff Game
The 1932 regular season ended with the Spartans (6–1–4) and Bears (6–1–6) tied atop the NFL standings (at the time, ties were not considered in a team's win percentage). There were no playoffs at the time and the champion was simply the team with the better win percentage with head-to-head results serving as the only tiebreaker. As both teams had the same record and they tied both of their meetings during the season, the NFL staged its first ever playoff game. The teams were set to meet at Wrigley Field, but the game was instead moved to the indoor Chicago Stadium due to severe weather, and modified rules were used because the stadium was smaller than regulation size. The Bears won the game, 9–0, to claim the NFL title. To date, this is the two teams' only playoff meeting (although the game officially counted in the regular season standings).

November 29, 
The Lions, having just moved to Detroit, decided to schedule an annual game on Thanksgiving in an attempt to draw fans. This idea proved to work as the game was played in front of a sellout crowd. The Bears entered the game with a perfect 11–0 record, while the Lions were 10–1. The Lions built a 16–7 lead at halftime, but the Bears would score 12 unanswered points in the second half to come away with the 19–16 to clinch the NFL Western Division title. The Bears and Lions have met a total of 18 times on Thanksgiving, all in Detroit, with the Bears holding a 10–8 record in the Thanksgiving meetings.

October 24, 
Lions wide receiver Chuck Hughes collapsed on the field and was rushed to the hospital, where he was pronounced dead. He remains the only player in NFL history to have died on the field.

November 27, 
The Bears come back from 14 points down in the fourth quarter to force overtime. Bears running back Dave Williams returned the opening kickoff of overtime 95 yards for a touchdown as the Bears left Detroit with a stunning 23–17 win. At the time, it was the shortest overtime in NFL history.

December 24, 
The Lions entered Week 17 needing one final win over a last-place Bears team to clinch a playoff spot. Despite building a 10–0 lead in the first quarter, the Lions found themselves trailing 20–17 in the fourth. The Lions tied the game at 20 with under two minutes to go, but the Bears' rookie kicker Paul Edinger secured the win for Chicago with a 54-yard field goal with two seconds left, all but eliminating the Lions from playoff contention. This proved to be a franchise-altering moment for Detroit, who hired Matt Millen in the offseason to rebuild the team.

September 30, 
It was a defensive slugfest for the first three quarters, with the score 13-3 in favor of Chicago. However, starting with a Shaun McDonald touchdown pass for Detroit in the early moments of the fourth quarter, the Lions' offense caught fire, scoring an additional 27 points in the fourth quarter, while still allowing two Bears touchdowns, to stun the Bears 37-27. The fourth quarter saw an NFL-record 48-points scored.

September 12, 
Lions wide receiver Calvin Johnson appeared to catch a touchdown pass late in the game that would have given the Lions the lead, but it was controversially ruled to not be a catch after Johnson was ruled to not have completed the process of catching the ball. Johnson had the ball in both hands, got both feet down, rolled over on his backside and put his hand with the ball in it on the ground. The call was reviewed on the instant replay review, but the "no catch" ruling was upheld. The rule for what defines a catch was updated in 2015, with this play (along with other similar plays) being a large reason for the change.

September 13, 
In both teams' first game of the season, the Lions led the Bears 23–6 in the fourth quarter. The Bears rallied back scoring 21 unanswered points and took a 27–23 lead with 1:54 left in the game. The Lions, however, still had a chance to win. Lions quarterback Matthew Stafford drove his team from their own 25 yard line all the way to the Bears' 16 yard line with 11 seconds left. The Lions attempted to go to the endzone but Stafford's pass was dropped in the endzone by Lions rookie running back D'Andre Swift which would've won the game for the Lions. On the next and last play of the game, Stafford's pass to the endzone was broken up by Bears rookie cornerback Jaylon Johnson to seal the Bears' 27–23 come-from-behind victory.

Game results

|-
| 
| Tie 1–1
| style="| Bears  14–6
| style="| Spartans  7–6
| Tie  1–1
| Portsmoth Spartans began play in 1930.  Spartans win the inaugural meeting to take a 1–0 series lead, the only time the Spartans/Lions would ever lead the series.
|-
| 
| Tie 1–1
| style="| Bears  9–6
| style="| Spartans  3–0
| Tie  2–2
|
|-
| 
| Tie 0–0–2
| Tie  13–13
| Tie  7–7
| Tie  2–2–2
|
|- style="font-weight:bold;background:#f2f2f2;"
| 1932 Playoffs
| style="| 
| style="| Bears  9–0
|
| Bears  4–2–2
| First ever NFL playoff game necessitated by the Bears and Spartans finishing with identical records and tying both regular season meetings.  Game moved indoors to Chicago Stadium, which had smaller-than-regulation dimensions.
|-
| 
| style="| 
| style="| Bears  17–14
| style="| Bears  17–7
| Bears  6–2–2
| Bears win 1933 NFL Championship.
|-
| 
| style="| 
| style="| Bears  19–16
| style="| Bears  19–16
| Bears  7–2–2
| Spartans move to Detroit and become the Lions.  Game in Detroit is the Lions' first annual Thanksgiving home game.  Bears lose 1934 NFL Championship.
|-
| 
| style="| 
| Tie  20–20
| style="| Lions  14–2
| Bears  7–3–3
| Lions win 1935 NFL Championship.
|-
| 
| Tie 1–1
| style="| Bears  12–10
| style="| Lions  13–7
| Bears  8–4–3
| 
|-
| 
| style="| 
| style="| Bears  28–20
| style="| Bears  13–0
| Bears  10–4–3
| Bears lose 1937 NFL Championship.
|-
| 
| style="| 
| style="| Lions  13–7
| style="| Lions  14–7
| Bears  10–6–3
| 
|-
| 
| Tie 1–1
| style="| Lions  10–0
| style="| Bears  23–13
| Bears  11–7–3
| 
|-

|-
| 
| Tie 1–1
| style="| Bears  7–0
| style="| Lions  17–14
| Bears  12–8–3
| Bears win 1940 NFL Championship.
|-
| 
| style="| 
| style="| Bears  49–0
| style="| Bears  24–7
| Bears  14–8–3
| Bears' 49–0 win is the largest margin of victory in the rivalry history for either team.  Lions move to Tiger Stadium. Bears win 1941 NFL Championship.
|-
| 
| style="| 
| style="| Bears  16–0
| style="| Bears  42–0
| Bears  16–8–3
| Bears lose 1942 NFL Championship.
|-
| 
| style="| 
| style="| Bears  35–14
| style="| Bears  27–21
| Bears  18–8–3
| Bears win 1943 NFL Championship.
|-
| 
| style="| 
| Tie  21–21
| style="| Lions  41–21
| Bears  18–9–4
| 
|-
| 
| style="| 
| style="| Lions  35–28
| style="| Lions  16–10
| Bears  18–11–4
| 
|-
| 
| style="| 
| style="| Bears  42–6
| style="| Bears  45–24
| Bears  20–11–4
| Bears win 1946 NFL Championship.
|-
| 
| style="| 
| style="| Bears  33–24
| style="| Bears  34–14
| Bears  22–11–4
| 
|-
| 
| style="| 
| style="| Bears  28–0
| style="| Bears  42–14
| Bears  24–11–4
| 
|-
| 
| style="| 
| style="| Bears  27–24
| style="| Bears  28–7
| Bears  26–11–4
| 
|-

|-
| 
| style="| 
| style="| Bears  6–3
| style="| Bears  35–23
| Bears  28–11–4
| 
|-
| 
| Tie 1–1
| style="| Lions  41–28
| style="| Bears  28–23
| Bears  29–12–4
| Bears win 11 straight meetings (1946–51).
|-
| 
| Tie 1–1
| style="| Bears  24–23
| style="| Lions  45–21
| Bears  30–13–4
| Lions win 1952 NFL Championship.
|-
| 
| style="| 
| style="| Lions  35–28
| style="| Lions  16–10
| Bears  30–15–4
| Lions win 1953 NFL Championship.
|-
| 
| Tie 1–1
| style="| Bears  28–24
| style="| Lions  48–23
| Bears  31–16–4
| Lions lose 1954 NFL Championship.
|-
| 
| style="| 
| style="| Bears  21–20
| style="| Bears  24–14
| Bears  33–16–4
| 
|-
| 
| Tie 1–1
| style="| Bears  38–21
| style="| Lions  42–10
| Bears  34–17–4
| Bears lose 1956 NFL Championship.
|-
| 
| Tie 1–1
| style="| Lions  21–13
| style="| Bears  27–7
| Bears  35–18–4
| Lions win 1957 NFL Championship.
|-
| 
| style="| 
| style="| Bears  21–16
| style="| Bears  20–7
| Bears  37–18–4 
| 
|-
| 
| style="| 
| style="| Bears  25–14
| style="| Bears  24–14
| Bears  39–18–4 
| 
|-

|-
| 
| Tie 1–1
| style="| Bears  28–7
| style="| Lions  36–0
| Bears  40–19–4
| 
|-
| 
| Tie 1–1
| style="| Lions  16–15
| style="| Bears  31–17
| Bears  41–20–4
|  
|-
| 
| Tie 1–1
| style="| Bears  3–0
| style="| Lions  11–3
| Bears  42–21–4
| 
|-
| 
| style="| 
| style="| Bears  24–14
| style="| Bears  37–21
| Bears  44–21–4 
| Bears win 1963 NFL Championship.
|-
| 
| Tie 1–1
| style="| Lions  10–0
| style="| Bears  27–24
| Bears  45–22–4
| 
|-
| 
| style="| 
| style="| Bears  38–10
| style="| Bears  24–10
| Bears  47–22–4 
| 
|-
| 
| Lions 1–0–1
| Tie 10–10
| style="| Lions  14–3
| Bears  47–23–5
| 
|-
| 
| style="| 
| style="| Bears  14–3
| style="| Bears  27–13
| Bears  49–23–5 
| 
|-
| 
| style="| 
| style="| Lions  28–10
| style="| Lions  42–0
| Bears  49–25–5 
| Lions' 42–0 win is the largest margin of victory over the Bears.  Lions first season sweep since 1953.
|-
| 
| style="| 
| style="| Lions  20–3
| style="| Lions  13–7
| Bears  49–27–5 
| 
|-

|-
| 
| style="| 
| style="| Lions  16–10
| style="| Lions  28–14
| Bears  49–29–5 
| Both teams placed in the NFC Central after AFL-NFL merger.
|-
| 
| Tie 1–1
| style="| Lions  28–3
| style="| Bears  28–23
| Bears  50-30–5
| Bears open Soldier Field.  
|-
| 
| style="| 
| style="| Lions  38–24
| style="| Lions  14–0
| Bears  50–32–5 
| 
|-
| 
| style="| 
| style="| Lions  30–7
| style="| Lions  40–7
| Bears  50–34–5 
| Lions post an 11–1 record from 1968–73, including a 6-game winning streak in Chicago.
|-
| 
| Tie 1–1
| style="| Bears  17–19
| style="| Lions  34–17
| Bears  51–35–5
| 
|-
| 
| Tie 1–1
| style="| Bears  25–21
| style="| Lions  27–7
| Bears  52–36–5
| Lions open Pontiac Silverdome.
|-
| 
| Tie 1–1
| style="| Bears  10–3
| style="| Lions  14–10
| Bears  53–37–5
|
|-
| 
| style="| 
| style="| Bears  30–20
| style="| Bears  31–14
| Bears  55–37–5 
| 
|-
| 
| Tie 1–1
| style="| Lions  21–17
| style="| Bears  19–0
| Bears  56–38–5
| 
|-
| 
| Tie 1–1
| style="| Bears  35–7
| style="| Lions  20–0
| Bears  57–39–5
| 
|-

|-
| 
| style="| 
| style="| Bears  24–7
| style="| Bears  23–17(OT)
| Bears  59–39–5 
| Dave Williams returns opening kickoff of overtime 95 yards for a touchdown in the game in Detroit.
|-
| 
| style="| 
| style="| Lions  23–7
| style="| Lions  48–17
| Bears  59–41–5 
|
|-
| 
| Tie 1–1
| style="| Bears  20–17
| style="| Lions  17–10
| Bears  60–42–5
| Both games played despite players strike reducing the season to 9 games.
|-
| 
| style="| 
| style="| Lions  38–17
| style="| Lions  31–17
| Bears  60–44–5 
| 
|-
| 
| style="| 
| style="| Bears  16–14
| style="| Bears  30–13
| Bears  62–44–5 
| 
|-
| 
| style="| 
| style="| Bears  24–3
| style="| Bears  37–17
| Bears  64–44–5 
| Bears win Super Bowl XX.
|-
| 
| style="| 
| style="| Bears  13–7
| style="| Bears  16–13
| Bears  66–44–5 
| 
|-
| 
| style="| 
| style="| Bears  30–10
| no game
| Bears  67–44–5 
| Game in Detroit cancelled due to 1987 NFL Players strike.
|-
| 
| style="| 
| style="| Bears  13–12
| style="| Bears  24–7
| Bears  69–44–5 
| 
|-
| 
| Tie 1–1
| style="| Lions  27–17
| style="| Bears  47–27
| Bears  70–45–5
| Bears win 10 straight meetings (1984–89).
|-

|-
| 
| Tie 1–1
| style="| Bears  23–17(OT)
| style="| Lions  38–21
| Bears  71–46–5
| 
|-
| 
| Tie 1–1
| style="| Bears  20–10
| style="| Lions  16–6
| Bears  72–47–5
| 
|-
| 
| Tie 1–1
| style="| Bears  27–24
| style="| Lions  16–3
| Bears  73–48–5
| 
|-
| 
| Tie 1–1
| style="| Lions  20–14
| style="| Bears  10–6
| Bears  74–49–5
| 
|-
| 
| Tie 1–1
| style="| Bears  20–10
| style="| Lions  21–16
| Bears  75–50–5
| 
|-
| 
| style="| 
| style="| Lions  24–17
| style="| Lions  27–7
| Bears  75–52–5
| 
|-
| 
| Tie 1–1
| style="| Bears  34–14
| style="| Lions  35–16
| Bears  76–53–5
| 
|-
| 
| style="| 
| style="| Lions  32–7
| style="| Lions  55–20
| Bears  76–55–5
|  
|-
| 
| Tie 1–1
| style="| Bears  31–27
| style="| Lions  26–3
| Bears  77–56–5
| 
|-
| 
| Tie 1–1
| style="| Bears  28–10
| style="| Lions  21–17
| Bears  78–57–5
| 
|-

|-
| 
| Tie 1–1
| style="| Lions  21–14
| style="| Bears  23–20
| Bears  79–58–5
| Bears win in Detroit combined with Rams win eliminates Lions from playoff contention.
|-
| 
| style="| 
| style="| Bears  13–0
| style="| Bears  24–0
| Bears  81–58–5 
| Bears first season sweep since 1988.
|-
| 
| Tie 1–1
| style="| Bears  20–17(OT)
| style="| Lions  23–20(OT)
| Bears  82–59–5
| Bears' home games were at Memorial Stadium due to renovations at Soldier Field.  Lions open Ford Field in Detroit. In Chicago, Lions win the coin toss in overtime, but elect to take the wind and not possession. The Bears score on the first possession in overtime and the Lions never get the ball back.
|-
| 
| Tie 1–1
| style="| Bears  24–16
| style="| Lions  12–10
| Bears  83–60–5
| 
|-
| 
| style="| 
| style="| Lions  20–16
| style="| Lions  19–13
| Bears  83–62–5
| 
|-
| 
| style="| 
| style="| Bears  38–6
| style="| Bears  19–13(OT)
| Bears  85–62–5 
| 
|-
| 
| style="| 
| style="| Bears  34–7
| style="| Bears  26–21
| Bears  87–62–5
| Bears lose Super Bowl XLI.
|-
| 
| style="| 
| style="| Lions  16–7
| style="| Lions  37–27
| Bears  87–64–5
| An NFL-record 48 points were scored in the fourth quarter in game in Detroit; Chicago led 13–3 after three quarters.
|-
| 
| style="| 
| style="| Bears  27–23
| style="| Bears  34–7
| Bears  89–64–5
| Lions complete first 0–16 season in NFL history.
|-
| 
| style="| 
| style="| Bears  48–24
| style="| Bears  37–23
| Bears  91–64–5
| 
|-

|-
| 
| style="| 
| style="| Bears  19–14
| style="| Bears  24–20
| Bears  93–64–5
| Lions WR Calvin Johnson appears to catch a game-winning touchdown in Chicago, but it is controversially ruled a no-catch.
|-
| 
| Tie 1–1
| style="| Bears  37–13
| style="| Lions  24–13
| Bears  94–65–5
| 
|-
| 
| style="| 
| style="| Bears  13–7
| style="| Bears  26–24
| Bears  96–65–5
| 
|-
| 
| style="| 
| style="| Lions  21–19
| style="| Lions  40–32
| Bears  96–67–5
| 
|-
| 
| style="| 
| style="| Lions  20–14
| style="| Lions  34–17
| Bears  96–69–5
| 
|-
| 
| style="| 
| style="| Lions  24–20
| style="| Lions  
| Bears  96–71–5
| 
|-
| 
| Tie 1–1
| style="| Bears  17–14
| style="| Lions  20–17
| Bears  97–72–5
| 
|-
| 
| style="| 
| style="| Lions  27–24
| style="| Lions  20–10
| Bears  97–74–5
| 
|-
| 
| style="| 
| style="| Bears  34–22
| style="| Bears  23–16
| Bears  99–74–5
| In spite of the Bears' victory in Chicago, that meeting is particularly infamous for Bears' placekicker Cody Parkey hitting the upright four times (two FG attempts, two XP attempts).
|-
| 
| style="| 
| style="| Bears  20–13
| style="| Bears  24–20
| Bears  101–74–5
| Bears record their 100th win in the rivalry, becoming the third team to record 100 wins over a single opponent (joining the Green Bay Packers who have 100 wins over the Lions and the New York Giants who have 100 wins over Washington Football Team).  Thus, the Lions became the first team to record 100 losses to two different opponents.
|-

|-
| 
| Tie 1–1
| style="| Lions  34–30
| style="| Bears  27–23
| Bears  102–75–5
| Bears come back from down 23–6 in the fourth quarter to win in Detroit. Conversely, Lions overcome 30–20 deficit with three minutes left to win in Chicago. Both games ended on game-winning stop. First time since 2000 that the road team wins both meetings.
|-
| 
| style="| 
| style="| Bears  24–14
| style="| Bears  16–14
| Bears  104–75–5
| 
|-
| 
| style="| 
| style="| Lions  31–30
| style="| Lions  41–10
| Bears  104–77–5
|
|- 

|-
| Regular season
| style="|Bears 103–77–5
| Bears 59–30–4
| Lions 47–44–1
|
|-
| Postseason
| style="|Bears 1–0
| Bears 1–0
| no games
| 1932 NFL Championship Game
|-
| Regular and postseason 
| style="|Bears 104–77–5
| Bears 60–30–4
| Lions 47–44–1
| 
|-

See also
Other sports rivalries involving the same cities:
Bulls–Pistons rivalry
Blackhawks–Red Wings rivalry
George Jewett Trophy

Other rivalries involving the two teams:
Bears–Packers rivalry
Bears–Vikings rivalry
Lions–Packers rivalry
Lions–Vikings rivalry

References

NFL.com All-Time Team vs. Team Results
mcubed.net's Lions-Bears Series History 1966–present

Chicago Bears
Detroit Lions
National Football League rivalries
Chicago Bears rivalries
Detroit Lions rivalries